Edmundas Zenonas Malūkas (born 15  April 1945) is a Lithuanian writer, published author and politician. He is also the former mayor of Trakai, a historic city and lake resort in Lithuania.

Published work 
Edmundas Malūkas is one of the most critically acclaimed and commercially successful Lithuanian writers of his generation. His first four novels were bestsellers, and more than 492,000 copies of his books are in print. He also writes screenplays for motion pictures and television shows.

Bibliography 
 Kraujo skonis: Crime novel. – Vilnius: Horizontas,(1992) – 286 pp.
 Juodieji želmenys: Crime novel. – Vilnius: Horizontas, (1993) – 414 pp.
 Moters kerštas: Romance novel. – Vilnius: Horizontas, (1994) – 364 pp. – 
 Šiukšlyno žmonės: Crime-romance novel. – Panevėžys: Magilė, (1995) – 302 pp. – 
 Migla: Romance. (I)(II) – Panevėžys: Magilė, (1997–1999) – 
 Vilko duona: Novel – Panevėžys: Magilė, (1998) – 205 pp. – 
 Duženos: Romance novel. – Panevėžys: Magilė, (2001) – 309 pp. – 
 Karalienė Barbora: Historical romance. – Panevėžys: Magilė, (2004) – 422 pp. – 
 Likimų šnekos: Romance novel – Panevėžys: Magilė, (2009) – 358 pp. – 
 Dilgės: Romance novel. – Panevėžys: Magilė, (2009) – 342 pp. – 
 Vytauto žemė: Historical romance. – Panevėžys: Magilė, 2016. – 704 pp. –

References

External links 
 WorldCat library catalog

1945 births
Living people
Writers of historical romances
Male novelists
Lithuanian writers